Jozef Džubara (born 15 May 1965) is a retired Slovak football defender.

References

1965 births
Living people
Slovak footballers
1. FC Tatran Prešov players
FC Hradec Králové players
MŠK Rimavská Sobota players
Czech First League players
Association football defenders
Slovak expatriate footballers
Expatriate footballers in the Czech Republic
Slovak expatriate sportspeople in the Czech Republic
Footballers from Bratislava